The Cabinet of Josef Ludwig von Armansperg (20 May 1835 – 2 February 1837) was formed after the fall of the government of Ioannis Kolettis on 20 May 1835.

Members of the Cabinet 
 Count Josef Ludwig von Armansperg, Chief Secretary of State, Regent of Greece
 Iakovos Rizos Neroulos, Secretary of State and Secretary for Foreign and Religious Affairs
 Nikolaos Theocharis, Secretary for Finance
 Georgios Praidis, Secretary for Justice
 Heinrich Christian von Schmaltz, Secretary for Military and Naval Affairs

On 14 February 1836, the government changed
 Drosos Mansolas, Secretary of State for the Interior
 Iakovos Rizos Neroulos, Secretary of State for the Royal Household, the Foreign Affairs, the Religious Affairs and Public Education, interim secretary of State for Justice
 Antonios Kriezis, Secretary of State for Naval Affairs (member of the English Party)
 Georgios Lassanis, Secretary of State for Finance
 Heinrich Christian von Schmaltz, Secretary of State for Military Affairs

In 1836, the government changed the administrative division of Greece.

Cabinets of Greece
1835 in Greece
1836 in Greece
1837 in Greece